Serp i Molot is a rural locality (a settlement) in Plyoso-Kuryinsky Selsoviet, Khabarsky District, Altai Krai, Russia. The population was 35 as of 2013. There are 3 streets.

Geography 
Serp i Molot is located 22 km east of Khabary (the district's administrative centre) by road. Pleso-Kurya is the nearest rural locality.

References 

Rural localities in Khabarsky District